Dumri Assembly constituency   is an assembly constituency in  the Indian state of Jharkhand.

Overview
Dumri police station is in Giridih district and Nawadih police station in Bermo sub-division of Bokaro district.

Dumri assembly constituency is part of Giridih (Lok Sabha constituency).

Members of Assembly 
1980: Shiva Mahto, Jharkhand Mukti Morcha
1985: Shiva Mahto, Independent
1990: Lal Chand Mahto, Janata Dal
1995: Shiva Mahto, Jharkhand Mukti Morcha
2000: Lal Chand Mahto, Janata Dal (United)
2005: Jagarnath Mahto, Jharkhand Mukti Morcha
2009: Jagarnath Mahto, Jharkhand Mukti Morcha
2014: Jagarnath Mahto, Jharkhand Mukti Morcha
2019: Jagarnath Mahto Jharkhand Mukti Morcha

Election Results

2019

See also
Vidhan Sabha
List of states of India by type of legislature

References
Schedule – XIII of Constituencies Order, 2008 of Delimitation of Parliamentary and Assembly constituencies Order, 2008 of the Election Commission of India 

Giridih district
Assembly constituencies of Jharkhand